The Mulot AM-20 was a Belgian single seat aerobatic trainer displayed at the 1937 Brussels Salon. Two were built.

Design and development

The 1937 AM-20 was the outcome of a long series of poorly recorded modifications of a Mulot sesquiplane sport design, begun in about 1925 with an  engine; in 1937 Les Ailes noted that its immediate predecessor had been flying without problems for three years.
 
Like its predecessors, it was a sesquiplane, with a lower wing providing only a fifth of the total area and with just over half the upper span. It was an all wood aircraft with wings built around spruce and plywood box spars, two in the one-piece upper wing and one in the lower. The upper leading edges were ply-skinned ahead, with fabric covering aft but the lower was entirely ply-skinned. The upper wing was rectangular in plan out to long, elliptical tips and, unlike the lower, was set with light dihedral. In front views the interplane struts presented as W-form with the outer elements formed from V-struts and the inner ones single struts to the upper fuselage. There was also a low cabane formed by a pair of transverse V-struts. Long ailerons filled most of the upper trailing edges.

The AM-20 was designed to be powered by one of two air-cooled, in-line engines, an inverted, six cylinder,  Train 6T or an upright, four cylinder  Cirrus Minor. The plywood-covered fuselage had an elliptical cross-section, formed with three longerons and ply frames. Its single, open cockpit was just below the wing trailing edge, where a shallow cut-out enhanced upward visibility. The fuselage ended with an integral fin carrying a balanced rudder and a tailplane mounted at mid fuselage height. The fabric-covered tail surfaces were roughly triangular in plan and profile.

Its wheels were on a split axle attached to the fuselage underside on its  mid-line and the landing legs, fitted with elastic shock absorbers, were near-vertically mounted on the lower wing spar at the meeting point of the inner and outer interplane struts and braced with forward drag struts. The wheels had helmet-style fairings.

Operational history

The first flight date is not known but, flown or unflown in its latest form, it was on display at the Brussels Salon of 1937. Two Train-powered aircraft were initially on the Belgian civil register, though one had been sold to France before the end of 1937. The other also went to France, though not until after World War II. There, this  example was modified into a Cirrus Minor powered two-seater, with the new cockpit under the wing. It first flew in June 1947.

Variants

AM-20 As described, with Train or Cirrus Minor engine. 
AM-220 Post-war French rebuild of a Train-powered AM-20 as a two-seater with a Cirrus Minor engine.

Specifications (AM-20)

References

Biplanes
Single-engined tractor aircraft
Aerobatic aircraft
1930s French sport aircraft